Eastbourne Borough Council is the local authority for the borough of Eastbourne in East Sussex.

Eastbourne is divided into 9 local wards, which each elect 3 borough councillors as local representatives, creating a total of 27 councillors.

The Borough Council meets at Eastbourne Town Hall. The authority's headquarters are nearby at 1 Grove Road, though there are a number of other administrative buildings located elsewhere in the town.

History

1858 Local Government Board

A Local Board was created in Eastbourne in 1859, following the Local Government Act 1858. This created a 'local government area' in Eastbourne and a predecessor organisation to Eastbourne Borough Council.

The town hall was designed by William Tadman Foulkes, and built between 1884 and 1886 under supervision of Henry Currey, the Duke of Devonshire's architect.

Eastbourne Corporation Act 1910

The Eastbourne Corporation Act 1910 brought in the area of Hampden Park (Willingdon Parish) to the wider designated Eastbourne borough.

Eastbourne Corporation Act 1926

The Eastbourne Corporation Act 1926 was to "empower the Mayor Aldermen and Burgesses of the borough of Eastbourne to acquire the Downs and Downland in and near the borough; to make further provision with regard to the improvement of the borough and the electricity undertaking of the Corporation; to authorise the consolidation of the rates of the borough; and for other purposes".

Elections

References

Non-metropolitan district councils of England
Local authorities in East Sussex
Leader and cabinet executives